The Pottery museum is an art museum in  Tabriz, Iran, established in one of the historical houses of the city known as Sarraflar’s house, which belongs to Qajar era.

It includes the following sections:
 Gallery: a permanent gallery of Ostad Abbas Ghabchi, Ostad Ahmad Ghabchi and Ostad Farida Tathiree’s pottery artworks also the best artworks of other famous artists.
 Howz-Khaneh: a place for temporary galleries of artworks of artists.
 Shop
 Training courses

See also
 Azarbaijan Museum
 Amir Nezam House
 Constitutional House of Tabriz
 Iron Age museum

References 
 http://www.eachto.ir

Museums in Tabriz
Houses in Iran
Ceramics museums